Reza Afshari is professor of history at Pace University. He received his Ph.D. at Temple University. His studies center on human rights in Iran, Islamic politics, and Islamic cultural relativism in particular.

Representative Publications
 “On Historiography of Human Rights Discourse,” Human Rights Quarterly, 29 (February 2007) 1-67.
 “Discourse and Practice of Human Rights Violations of Iranians of the Baha’i Faith in the Islamic Republic of Iran,” a chapter in a book, edited by Dominic Brookshaw of McGill University, Routledge, London,  2007.
 Human Rights in Iran: the Abuse of Cultural Relativism, University of Pennsylvania Press, 2001. Hardcover, pp. 359

Professional affiliations
Middle East Studies Association of America, Committee for Academic Freedom in the Middle East and North Africa

External links
 Homepage with Pace University
 Human Rights in Iran - The Abuse of Cultural Relativism, University of Pennsylvania Press

Living people
21st-century Iranian historians
Pace University faculty
Islam and politics
Middle Eastern studies in the United States
Temple University alumni
Year of birth missing (living people)